Saint-Maurice-sur-Eygues (literally Saint-Maurice on Eygues; Vivaro-Alpine: Sant Maurici) is a commune in the Drôme department in southeastern France.

Population

See also
Communes of the Drôme department

References

Communes of Drôme